Çakırlar is a village in the Yapraklı District of Çankırı Province in Turkey. Its population is 91 (2021).

References

Villages in Yapraklı District